Caribbean Air Sign, previously named FlyTortuga, was a Dominican-based carrier that operates flights into the Dominican Republic, with domestics flights, and from Dominican Republic to the Caribbean.
The hub of this airline was Punta Cana International Airport.

History
This airline was founded in 2006 with the name of FlyTortuga Inc., but failed. In 2008 the airline changed their name to Caribbean Air Sign (CAS); it ran a charter operation with three owned aircraft.

Destinations

Domestics

Cabo Rojo Airport
La Romana International Airport
Punta Cana International Airport Hub
Cibao International Airport
María Montez International Airport
Las Américas International Airport
Arroyo Barril International Airport
Gregorio Luperón International Airport

International

Fleet
1 Piper PA-31 Navajo  
2 Cessna 172

External links
 https://web.archive.org/web/20090305054722/http://caribbeanairsigns.com/?

Defunct airlines of the Dominican Republic
Airlines established in 2006
2006 establishments in the Dominican Republic
Airlines disestablished in 2010
2010 disestablishments in the Dominican Republic